This is a list of episodes of the South Korean variety-music show King of Mask Singer in 2015. The show airs on MBC as part of their Sunday Night lineup. The names listed below are in performance order. A new rule was introduced in Episode 5, with the eliminated singer being allowed to sing the next song they prepared, and taking off their mask during the instrumental break of their song.

 – Contestant is instantly eliminated by the live audience and judging panel
 – After being eliminated, contestant performs a prepared song for the next round and takes off their mask during the instrumental break
 – After being eliminated and revealing their identity, contestant has another special performance
 – Contestant advances to the next round
 – Contestant becomes the challenger
 – Mask King

Episodes

Pilot

Contestants : Jo Kwon (2AM), Kim Ye-won, K.Will, Shin Bo-ra, Solji (EXID), Won Ki-joon, Hong Jin-young

The pilot was broadcast on 18 February 2015.

Round 1

1st Generation Mask King

Contestants : Kang Kyun-sung (Noel), Ivy, Kim Ji-woo, Luna (f(x)), Sandeul of B1A4, Park Gwang-hyun, 

Episode 1

Episode 1 was broadcast on April 5, 2015. This marks the beginning of the First Generation.

Episode 2

Episode 2 was broadcast on April 12, 2015.

2nd Generation Mask King

Contestants : , Kim Jong-seo, Shin Soo-ji, Hyun Woo, Lee Changmin (2AM/Homme), Lee Hong-gi (F.T. Island), Jang Hye-jin, G.NA

Episode 3

Episode 3 was broadcast on April 19, 2015. This marks the beginning of the Second Generation.

Episode 4

Episode 4 was broadcast on April 26, 2015.

3rd Generation Mask King

Contestants : Kahi, Yook Sung-jae (BtoB),  (Can), Jinju, Eric Nam, Song Ji-eun (Secret)

Episode 5

Episode 5 was broadcast on May 3, 2015. This marks the beginning of the Third Generation.

Episode 6

Episode 6 was broadcast on May 10, 2015.

Luna released a digital special single "Don't Cry For Me" (미소를 띄우며 나를 보낸 그 모습처럼) for the show after her elimination. The song is a remake of 's 1986 version.

4th Generation Mask King

Contestants : Ailee, Yook Jung-wan, Hong Seok-cheon, Taeil (Block B), Kim Yeon-woo, Sojin (Girl's Day)

Episode 7

Episode 7 was broadcast on May 17, 2015. This marks the beginning of the Fourth Generation.

Episode 8

Episode 8 was broadcast on May 24, 2015.

5th Generation Mask King

Contestants : , Kim Seul-gi, Chunji (Teen Top), Min (Miss A), Ahn Jae-mo, Seo In-young

Episode 9

Episode 9 was broadcast on May 31, 2015. This marks the beginning of the Fifth Generation.

Episode 10

Episode 10 was broadcast on June 7, 2015.

6th Generation Mask King

Episode 11

Episode 11 was broadcast on June 14, 2015. This marks the beginning of the Sixth Generation.

Episode 12

Episode 12 was broadcast on June 21, 2015.

7th Generation Mask King

Contestants : Lyn, Song Won-geun, Lee Ki-chan, Choi Jung-in, Gaeko (Dynamic Duo), Moon Hee-kyung, Kim Boa (Spica)

Episode 13

Episode 13 was broadcast on June 28, 2015. This marks the beginning of the Seventh Generation.

Episode 14

Episode 14 was broadcast on July 5, 2015.

8th Generation Mask King

Contestants :  (NRG), Tei, Yuju (GFriend), Lee Jung, Kim Tae-gyun (Cultwo)

Episode 15

Episode 15 was broadcast on July 12, 2015. This marks the beginning of the Eighth Generation.

Episode 16

Episode 16 was broadcast on July 19, 2015.

9th Generation Mask King

Episode 17

Episode 17 was broadcast on July 26, 2015. This marks the beginning of the Ninth Generation.

Episode 18

Episode 18 was broadcast on August 2, 2015.

10th Generation Mask King

Contestants : , Lee Sung-kyung,  (Big Mama), Alex Chu (Clazziquai Project), Son Dong-woon (HIGHLIGHT), Bada Kim

Episode 19

Episode 19 was broadcast on August 9, 2015. This marks the beginning of the Tenth Generation.

Episode 20

Episode 20 was broadcast on August 16, 2015.

11th Generation Mask King

Contestants : Mikey (Duble Sidekick), Solar (Mamamoo), Jung Sang-hoon, Chen (EXO),  (8Eight), 

Episode 21

Episode 21 was broadcast on August 23, 2015. This marks the beginning of the Eleventh Generation.

Episode 22

Episode 22 was broadcast on August 30, 2015.

12th Generation Mask King

Contestants : , Kim Dong-wook, Lim Hyung-joo, Kim Young-chul, Sungtae, Uji (Bestie)

Episode 23

Episode 23 was broadcast on September 6, 2015. This marks the beginning of the Twelfth Generation.

Episode 24

Episode 24 was broadcast on September 13, 2015.

Special Live 2015: Your Choice! King of Mask Singer

Contestants : Kim Boa (Spica), Kim Ye-won, Yook Sung-jae (BtoB), Jang Hye-jin, 

The special live broadcast aired on September 11, 2015, as part of the DMC Festival. This was a special edition that brought back contestants that had been eliminated in previous episodes, and a special Mask King was chosen from live voting (in 3 minutes after each pair's performance). Jo Jang-hyuk was able to perform as a challenger in Episode 34.

13th Generation Mask King

Contestants : Sung Ji-ru, Lee Seok-hoon (SG Wannabe), Byul, Choa (AOA), Gummy, Simon Dominic

Episode 25

Episode 25 was broadcast on September 20, 2015. This marks the beginning of the Thirteenth Generation.

Episode 26

Episode 26 was broadcast on September 27, 2015.

14th Generation Mask King

Contestants : , Bae Ki-sung (CAN), Wax, Lee Changsub (BtoB), Park Jung-ah (Jewelry), Cheetah, 

Episode 27

Episode 27 was broadcast on October 4, 2015. This marks the beginning of the Fourteenth Generation.

Episode 28

Episode 28 was broadcast on October 11, 2015.

15th Generation Mask King

Contestants : Kim Dong-wan (Shinhwa), Chunja, Gong Hyung-jin, Cho Kyu-hyun (Super Junior), Park Ji-yoon

Episode 29

Episode 29 was broadcast on October 18, 2015. This marks the beginning of the Fifteenth Generation.

Episode 30

Episode 30 was broadcast on October 25, 2015.

16th Generation Mask King

Contestants : , Kim Jung-min, Dami Im, Hong Jin-young, Seunghee (Oh My Girl), Lee Hyun (8Eight/Homme), 

Episode 31

Episode 31 was broadcast on November 1, 2015. This marks the beginning of the Sixteenth Generation.

Episode 32

Episode 32 was broadcast on November 8, 2015.

17th Generation Mask King

Contestants : Lee Young-jin, Raina (After School/Orange Caramel), Younha,  (Norazo), Kim Jung-tae, Daehyun (B.A.P), Cha Ji-yeon, Hyun Jin-young

Episode 33

Episode 33 was broadcast on November 15, 2015. This marks the beginning of the Seventeenth Generation.

Episode 34

Episode 34 was broadcast on November 22, 2015. "Sensitivity Vocal Cricket", who was Mask King of the special live broadcast (aired September 11, 2015), participated in the final battle with the Sixteenth Generation Mask King and the Challenger.

18th Generation Mask King

Episode 35

Episode 35 was broadcast on November 29, 2015. This marks the beginning of the Eighteenth Generation.

Episode 36

Episode 36 was broadcast on December 6, 2015.

19th Generation Mask King

Contestants : Lee Soo-young, Chae Yeon, G.O (MBLAQ), Kangnam (M.I.B), Yoonhan, Lee Chun-soo, Lee Ji-hoon

Episode 37

Episode 37 was broadcast on December 13, 2015. This marks the beginning of the Nineteenth Generation.

Episode 38

Episode 38 was broadcast on December 20, 2015.

20th Generation Mask King

Contestants : Lim Jeong-hee, Jo Hye-ryun, Kim Nam-joo (Apink), Kihyun (Monsta X), Lee Pil-mo, Jeon Woo-sung (Noel)

Episode 39 was broadcast on December 27, 2015. This marks the beginning of the Twentieth Generation.

Special releases

Digital single

Special album

References 

Lists of King of Mask Singer episodes
Lists of variety television series episodes
Lists of South Korean television series episodes
2015 in South Korean television